Freedom Township is one of twelve townships in Carroll County, Illinois, USA.  As of the 2020 census, its population was 799 and it contained 920 housing units.

Geography

Cemeteries
The township contains these four cemeteries: Arnolds Grove, Arnolds Grove Dunkard, Renner and Wolf.

Demographics
As of the 2020 census there were 799 people, 218 households, and 149 families residing in the township. The racial makeup of the township was 96.25% White, 0.50% African American, 0.38% Native American, 0.38% Asian, 0.13% Pacific Islander, 0.38% from other races, and 2.00% from two or more races. Hispanic or Latino of any race were 0.75% of the population.

There were 218 households, out of which 13.80% had children under the age of 18 living with them, 68.35% were married couples living together, 0.00% had a female householder with no spouse present, and 31.65% were non-families. 28.00% of all households were made up of individuals, and 12.80% had someone living alone who was 65 years of age or older. The average household size was 2.08 and the average family size was 2.54.

The township's age distribution consisted of 15.4% under the age of 18, none from 18 to 24, 8.8% from 25 to 44, 27.9% from 45 to 64, and 47.8% who were 65 years of age or older. The median age was 62.6 years. For every 100 females, there were 114.2 males. For every 100 females age 18 and over, there were 108.7 males.

The median income for a household in the township was $65,208, and the median income for a family was $82,560. Males had a median income of $32,679 versus $41,058 for females. The per capita income for the township was $36,092. No families and 1.5% of the population were below the poverty line.

School districts
 Eastland Community Unit School District 308
 West Carroll Community Unit School District 314

Political districts
 Illinois' 16th congressional district
 State House District 71
 State Senate District 36

References
 
 United States Census Bureau 2007 TIGER/Line Shapefiles
 United States National Atlas

External links
 City-Data.com
 Illinois State Archives
 Carroll County official site

Townships in Carroll County, Illinois
Townships in Illinois